Tabernaemontana capuronii is a species of plant in the family Apocynaceae. It is found in Madagascar.

The Latin specific epithet of capuronii is in honor of the French botanist René Capuron. It was first published in J. Ethno-Pharmacol. Vol.10 on page 7 in 1984.

References

capuronii
Endemic flora of Madagascar
Plants described in 1984